Ji Yun-Nam (born 20 November 1976) is a former North Korean international footballer, who played for April 25 in the DPR Korea League.

International career
Ji has appeared for the Korea DPR national football team in eight FIFA World Cup qualifying matches. Primarily a central defensive midfield, Ji plays in the left-back position for the national team. 

On 15 June 2010, he scored a goal against Brazil, slotting it past the goalkeeper in the 2010 FIFA World Cup group stage encounter between the highest ranked and the lowest ranked qualified teams at the finals. Brazil ended up winning the game 2–1. His would be the only goal scored by North Korea in the tournament.

Following the Brazil-Korea DPR game, players exchanged shirts, revealing Ji's lean and muscular physique. This generated the affectionate nickname "The Peoples' Six-pack".

Goals

References

External links
 

1976 births
Living people
North Korean footballers
North Korea international footballers
Sportspeople from Pyongyang
April 25 Sports Club players
2010 FIFA World Cup players
2011 AFC Asian Cup players

Association football defenders